Psoloptera aurifera is a moth in the subfamily Arctiinae. It was described by Gottlieb August Wilhelm Herrich-Schäffer in 1854. It is found in Rio de Janeiro, Brazil.

References

Moths described in 1854
Euchromiina